Cyrtodactylus pronarus  is a species of gecko that is endemic to the McIlwraith Range in Queensland Australia.

References 

Cyrtodactylus
Reptiles described in 2011
Taxa named by Patrick J. Couper